was a Japanese economist who was considered internationally to be one of the most important scholars of Karl Marx's theory of value. He taught at Kokugakuin University, Tokyo, and was a professor emeritus of the University of Tokyo.

Itoh belonged to the school of economic thought founded by Kozo Uno and was one of the few Japanese Marxian economists who published widely in English-language journals such as Science & Society, Monthly Review, Capital & Class, New Left Review and Ampo. He published 24 books, of which 6 are in English, and 5 are translated and published in Chinese.

Itoh died from a heart attack on February 7, 2023, at the age of 86.

Books in English
 Value and Crisis (1980).
 The Basic Theory of Capitalism (1987)
 The world economic crisis and Japanese capitalism (1990)
 Political Economy for Socialism (1995)
  with Costas Lapavitsas, Political economy of money and finance (1999)
 The Japanese Economy Reconsidered (2000)

Articles in English
 Itoh, Makoto: "Money and credit in socialist economies: A reconsideration," Capital & Class, issue no. 60 (Autumn 1996). (retrieved from bnet 12-04-2010).
 Itoh, Makoto: "Skilled Labour in Value Theory" Capital & Class, issue no. 11 (Spring 1987) no. 1 pp. 39–58

References

External links
 Itoh, Makoto: The Burst of Bubble and Political Economy of the 1990s Depression. (PDF)
 Filho, Alfredo Saad: Political Economy of Money and Finance.
 Foster, John Bellamy: Marxism and the Uno School. The Basic Theory of Capitalism: The Forms and Substance of the Capitalist Economy by Makoto Itoh.
 Lapavitsas, Costas: Political Economy for Socialism.
 Hampton, Matt: Hegemony, class struggle and the radical historiography of global monetary standards.
 William K. Tabb, William K.: Political Economy for Socialism. – book reviews.
 List of current publications
 World Association of Political Economy

1936 births
2023 deaths
Marxian economists
Marxist theorists
Japanese economists
Japanese Marxists
Members of the Japan Academy
University of Tokyo alumni
Academic staff of the University of Tokyo
People from Tokyo